The Chevrolet Series F of 1917 was an American automobile manufactured by Chevrolet before they became a division of General Motors. The successor of the Series H, it had a longer wheelbase and other improvements, but kept the same engine. It was replaced the following year by the Series FA in 1918, which had a larger, more powerful engine. It was sold as the larger alternative to the Chevrolet Series 490, and the Model F was available for US$800 ($ in  dollars ) as either a roadster or touring sedan. As the Model F and Series 490 were in direct competition with the Ford Model T, sales were recorded at 110,839 for Chevrolet, with 57,692 Series 490 and 3,493 Model F. Chevrolet instituted Knock-down kit assembly where the product was created at Flint Assembly, then shipped by rail to the branch locations and locally assembled using locally sourced items such as tires, glass and other items. In 1917, the Monroe Motor Company was sold to William Small of Flint MI and was no longer sold by independent Chevrolet dealers when they weren't part of GM. Mason Motor Company was merged into Chevrolet once it became a division of GM and was used to supply engines for GM-Chevrolet vehicles.

Technical features
The F had a wheelbase of 108 inches. It had the same four-cylinder engine as the H, with a displacement of 171 cubic inches and 24 horsepower.

Engine specifications
Overhead-valve
Inline
Four-cylinder cast-iron block
Bore and stroke: 3 11/16 × 4 in
Displacement: 171 cid
Brake hp: 24 HP
Main bearings: three
Valve lifters: solid
Carburetor: Zenith double jet

Models

The Series F preserved the model names and body styles of the Series H it replaced: the Royal Mail model F-2 roadster and the Baby Grand model F-5 open touring car.

On both models, the front fenders followed a straight line from right behind the center of the front wheels to the runningboard.

References 

F